GSI Pontivy is a French football club based in Pontivy, Morbihan. It was founded in 1935. They play at the Stade Municipal du Faubourg de Verdun, which has a capacity of 3,200. The colours of the club are green and white.

For the 2018–19 season the club plays in the Championnat National 3.

Honours 
 Brittany DH championship : 1994

Current squad

Notes

External links 
  

 
1935 establishments in France
Association football clubs established in 1935
Sport in Morbihan
Football clubs in Brittany